White trash is a derogatory racial and class-related slur used in American English to refer to poor white people, especially in the rural areas of the southern United States. The label signifies a social class inside the white population and especially a degraded standard of living. It is used as a way to separate the "noble and hardworking" "good poor" from the lazy, "undisciplined, ungrateful and disgusting" "bad poor". The use of the term provides middle- and upper-class whites a means of distancing themselves from the poverty and powerlessness of poor whites, who cannot enjoy those privileges, as well as a way to disown their perceived behavior.

The term has been adopted for people living on the fringes of the social order, who are seen as dangerous because they may be criminal, unpredictable, and without respect for political, legal, or moral authority. While the term is mostly used pejoratively by urban and middle-class whites as a class signifier, some white entertainers self-identify as "white trash", considering it a badge of honor, and celebrate the stereotypes and social marginalization of lower-class whiteness.

In common usage, "white trash" overlaps in meaning with "cracker", used of people in the backcountry of the Southern states; "hillbilly", regarding poor people from Appalachia; "Okie" regarding those with origins in Oklahoma; and "redneck", regarding rural origins, especially from the South. The primary difference is that "redneck", "cracker", "Okie", and "hillbilly" emphasize that a person is poor and uneducated and comes from the backwoods with little awareness of and interaction with the modern world, while "white trash" – and the modern term "trailer trash" – emphasizes the person's supposed moral failings, without regard to the setting of their upbringing. While the other terms suggest rural origins, "white trash" and "trailer trash" may be urban or suburban as well.

Scholars from the late 19th to the early 21st century explored generations of families who were considered "disreputable", such as the Jukes family and the Kallikak family, both pseudonyms for real families.

Terminology
The expression "white trash" probably originated in the slang used by enslaved African Americans, in the early decades of the 1800s, and was quickly adopted by richer white people who used the term to stigmatize and separate themselves from the kind of whites they considered to be inferior and without honor, thus carrying on "the ancient prejudice against menials, swineherds, peddlers and beggars."

"Poor white trash", then, is the term applied to the "bad poor", not the romanticized "noble and hardworking" "good poor" One word applied to such people was "tackeys" or "tackies". According to the Oxford Dictionaries, it was once applied to horses of little or no value, then was transferred to people seen to have little or no value. There may have been an intermediate time when it was used to describe those who may have been wealthy but had no family roots or good breeding. It now generally refers to anything that is cheap, shoddy, gaudy, seedy, or in bad taste.

In White Trash: The 400-Year Untold History of Class in America, historian Nancy Isenberg compiled a long, but hardly definitive, list of derisive names that have been used to refer to poor whites:

As a racial slur

In the journal Critique of Anthropology, J. Z. Wilson argues that the term "white trash" "stands as a form of racism", and Annalee Newitz and Matthew Wray, writing in The Minnesota Review consider it an instance of "Yoking a classist epithet to a racist one." It is described as a "racial slur" by Lucas Lynch, and filmmaker John Waters considered it the "last racist thing you can say and get away with." In 2020, Reader's Digest included "white trash" on its list of "12 Everyday Expressions That Are Actually Racist".

Description and causes

Description
Many poor whites in the 19th century South were only able to locate themselves on the worst possible land, since the best land had already been taken by the slaveholders, large and small. They lived and attempted to survive on ground that was sandy or swampy or covered in scrub pine and not suited for agriculture; for this, some became known as "sandhillers" and "pineys". These "hard-scratch" inhabitants were seen to match their surroundings: they were "stony, stumpy, and shrubby, as the land they lived on." Many ended up in the mountains, at the time the first frontier of the country. After the Civil War, these people began to be referred to as "hillbillies".

In the popular imagination of the mid-19th century, "poor white trash" were a "curious" breed of degenerate, gaunt, haggard people who suffered from numerous physical and social defects. They were dirty, callow, ragged, cadaverous, leathery, and emaciated, and had feeble children with distended abdomens who were wrinkled and withered and looked aged beyond their physical years, so that even 10-year-olds' "countenances are stupid and heavy and they often become dropsical and loathsome to sight," according to a New Hampshire schoolteacher. The skin of a poor white Southerner had a "ghastly yellowish-white" tinge to it, like "yellow parchment", and was waxy looking, or they were so white they almost appeared to be albinos. The parents were listless and slothful, did not properly care for their children, and were addicted to alcohol. They were looked on with contempt by both upper-class planters and yeoman – the non-slave-owning smallholders. 

Harriet Beecher Stowe described a white trash woman and her children in Dred: A Tale of the Great Dismal Swamp, published in 1856:

White Southerners of the period were used to equating coarse and disagreeable appearances with immoral thoughts and uncivil or criminal behavior: an evil countenance often meant a villainous character. In this way poor whites with unhealthy or ugly bodies – the result in large part of poor diets, lack of personal grooming, and a toxic environment – were condemned by the larger white community at first sight, with no thought given to investigating or ameliorating the conditions that were responsible for their appearances.

The physical characteristics of white trash were thought to be completely genetic in nature, passed on, parents to children, from generation to generation, serving to separate poor whites from the Southern gentility and those yeomen who shared patrician values. Slavery apologist Daniel R. Hundley's 1860 book Social Relations in Our Southern States includes a chapter entitled "White Trash". He used the existence of poor whites with supposed "bad blood" to argue that genetics and not societal structure was the problem, and that therefore slavery was justified. He called white trash the "laziest two-legged animals that walk erect on the face of the Earth", describing their appearance as "lank, lean, angular, and bony, with ... sallow complexion, awkward manners, and a natural stupidity or dullness of intellect that almost surpasses belief." "Who ever yet knew a Godolphin [ideal man] that was sired by a miserable scrub?," asks Hundley as supposed proof for his theory, "or who ever yet saw an athletic, healthy human being, standing six feet in his stockings, who was the offspring of runtish forefathers or wheezy, asthmatic, or consumptive parents?"  Hundley considered the white trash population to be morally inferior not only to other whites, but to the black slave population as well.  His evaluation was seconded by Randolph Shotwell, a future Ku Klux Klan leader, who described them as "a distinct race of people ... thriftless, uneducated, unthinking beings, who live little better than negroes."

W. J. Cash in The Mind of the South (1941) writes in his description of the mythical Old South that beneath the aristocratic Cavalier planters was perceived to be

...a vague race lumped together indiscriminately as the poor whites – very often, in fact, as the "white-trash". These people belong in the main to a physically inferior type, having sprung for the most part from the convict servants, redemptioners, and debtors of old Virginia and Georgia, with a sprinkling of the most unsuccessful sort of European peasants and farm laborers and the dregs of the European town slums. And so, of course, the gulf between them and the master class was impassable, and their ideas and feeling did not enter into the make-up of he prevailing Southern civilization.

Cash goes on to explain that those who arrived in the New World under these circumstances – at least early in the history of European settlement there – were as likely to end up in the planter class or as yeoman farmers as they were to become poor whites, as land, at first, was cheap and available, and hard work could pay off in a rise in economic and social status. But there were some who did not succeed,

...the weakest element of the old backcountry population ... those who had been driven back [by the plantation system] to the red hills and the sandlands and the pine barrens and the swamps – to all the marginal lands of the South; those who, because of the poorness of the soil on which they dwelt or the great inaccessibility of markets, were, as a group, completely barred from escape or economic and social advance. They were the people to whom the term "cracker" properly applied – the "white-trash" and "po' bukra" ... [They exhibited] a distinctive physical character – a striking lankness of frame and slackness of muscle in association with a shambling gait, a boniness and misshapeness of head and feature, a peculiar swallow swartness, or alternatively a not less peculiar and a not less faded-out colorness of skin and hair.

According to Cash, this physical appearance is not, for the most part, genetically determined, but is the result of the brutal circumstances in which this group had to survive.

Behavior

In the mid-19th century South, even upper-class parents were extremely indulgent of their children, encouraging both boys and girls to be aggressive, even ferocious. They soon learned that they were expected to grab for what they wanted, wrestle with their siblings in front of their parents, disobey parental orders, make a racket with their toys, and physically attack visitors. Patrician girls would later be taught to be proper young ladies, but boys continued to be unrestrained, lest they become effeminate. These behaviors – which were also practiced by poorer whites to the extent their circumstances allowed – propelled young men into gambling, drinking, whoring and fighting, which "manly" behavior was more or less expected – but which their mothers carefully did not allow themselves to be aware of – and which was certainly preferred to effeminacy. This pattern of child-rearing was predominate in the backwoods, where it was not limited to the upper class, but could be found among yeoman and poor whites alike. For white trash, given this method of raising children, combined with violent folkways inherited from their English, Irish, and Scottish progenitors, it is not unremarkable that their culture should have been a violent one.

The Southern style of child-rearing paralleled that of the Native Americans who were a constant presence in post-colonial America, especially in the backwoods areas. Thus it is not unusual that another theory for the existence of the white trash population held that the degraded condition of poor white southerners was the result of their living in such close proximity to blacks and Native Americans. Samuel Stanhope Smith, a minister and educator who was the seventh president of Princeton College, wrote in 1810 that poor white southerners lived in "a state of absolute savagism," which caused them to resemble Indians in the color of their skin and their clothing, a belief that was endemic in the 18th and early 19th century. Smith saw them as a stumbling block in the evolution of mainstream American whites, a view that had previously been expressed by Michel-Guillaume-Jean de Crèvecoeur in his 1782 book, Letters from an American Farmer. Crèvecoeur, a French soldier-diplomat who resettled in the United States and changed his name to J. Hector St. John, considered poor white southerners to be "not ... a very pleasing spectacle" and inferior to the prototypical American he celebrated in his book, but still hopes that the effects of progress would improve the condition of these mongrelized, untamed, half-savage drunken people who exhibit "the most hideous parts of our society."

In his classic study, Democracy in America (1835), French aristocrat Alexis de Tocqueville sees the state of poor white southerners as being one of the effects of the slave system. He describes them as ignorant, idle, prideful, self-indulgent, and weak, and writes about southern whites in general:

Restricted from holding political office due to property qualifications, their ability to vote at the mercy of the courts, which were controlled by the slave-holding planters, poor whites had few advocates within the political system or the dominant social hierarchy. Although many were tenant farmers or day laborers, other white trash people were forced to live as scavengers, thieves and vagrants. But all, employed or not, were socially ostracized by "proper" white society by being forced to use the back door when entering "proper" homes. Even slaves looked down on them: when poor whites came begging for food, the slaves called them "stray goats."

Despite poor whites being looked down on by both the planters and the yeoman farmers, and their "rage" at being referred to as "white-trash", they, as a group, held the Blacks of the South in deep contempt. Cash writes that the slave system "bred [in common whites] a savage and ignoble hate for the Negro, which required only opportunity to break forth in relentless ferocity..."

Poor Southern whites in the 19th century could also casual about male sexual activity outside of marriage, sometimes exhibiting a moral informality that was only slightly suppressed by the rise of evangelical revivalism and increasing church discipline. This behavior was part of a roistering tradition that had roots in the British origins of the class, and differentiated white trash from both the yeoman class and landed gentry of the plantations, where church proscriptions and social inhibitions held sway, respectively. For poor white women, there was generally a double standard, and a girl who broke the code of chastity and bore a child outside of wedlock would usually be branded as "shameless" and was often subject to public humiliation. However, there were instances where this was not the case. In some deep backwoods of the mountains, a girl bearing a child before marriage was not shamed, as it was considered proof of the female's fecundity. These patterns of behavior, and the sexual casualness they imply, may have become a stereotype, but the perception nevertheless continued into the 20th century and remains an important part of the idea of how white trash people – such as "trailer trash" – behave.

Political ramifications

Northerners claimed that the existence of white trash was the result of the system of slavery in the South, while Southerners worried that these clearly inferior whites would upset the "natural" class system which held that all whites were superior to all other races, especially blacks. People of both regions expressed concern that if the number of white trash people increased significantly, they would threaten the Jeffersonian ideal of a population of educated white freemen as the basis of a robust American democracy.

For Ralph Waldo Emerson, the transcendentalist and pre-eminent American lecturer, writer and philosopher of the mid-nineteenth century, poor people of all kinds – including poor white Southerners – lived in poverty because of inherent traits in their nature. The poor were "ferried over the Atlantic & carted to America to ditch & to drudge, to make the land fertile ... and then to lie down prematurely to make a spot of greener grass..." These people Emerson referred to as "guano" were fated to inhabit the lowest niches of society, and he specifically excluded them from his definition of what an American was. Emerson's "American" was of Saxon heritage, descended from the Danes, Norsemen, Saxons, and Anglo-Saxons, known for their "excess of virility", their "beastly ferocity", and – at least in Emerson's eyes – their beauty. These were not traits that were shared by the poor white Southerners. Americans may have degenerated somewhat in comparison to their ancestors, one of the weakening effects of civilization, but they still maintained their superiority over other "races", and white Southerners of all kinds, but especially poor ones, were themselves inferior to their countrymen from New England and the north.

Some, such as Theodore Roosevelt, saw poor "degenerate" whites – as well as the mass of immigrants from southern and eastern Europe (those from northern Europe having been accepted in the Anglo-Saxon white race) – as being a major part of the problem of "race suicide", the concept that poor whites and unwanted immigrants would eventually out-procreate those of the dominant and superior white "race", causing it to die out or be supplanted, to the detriment of the country.

History
Beginning in the early 17th century, the City of London shipped their unwanted excess population, including vagrant children, to the American colonies – especially the Colony of Virginia, the Province of Maryland, and the Province of Pennsylvania – where they became not apprentices, as the children had been told, but indentured servants, working particularly in the fields, especially in Maryland and Tidewater Virginia. Even before the beginning of the Atlantic slave trade brought Africans to the British colonies in 1619, this influx of "transported" English, Welsh, Scots, and Irish was a crucial part of the American workforce. The Virginia Company also imported boatloads of poor women to be sold as brides. The numbers of these all-but-slaves was significant: by the middle of the 17th century, at a time when the population of Virginia was 11,000, only 300 were Africans, who were outnumbered by English, Irish and Scots indentured servants. In New England, one-fifth of the Puritans were indentured servants. More indentured servants were sent to the colonies as a result of insurrections in Ireland. Oliver Cromwell sent hundreds of Irish Catholics to British North America during the Irish Confederate Wars (1641–1653).

In 1717, the Parliament of Great Britain passed the Transportation Act 1717, which allowed for the penal transportation of tens of thousands of convicts to North America, in order to alleviate overcrowding in British prisons. By the time penal transportation ceased during the American Revolutionary War (1775–1783), some 50,000 people had been transported to the New World under the law. When the American market closed to them, the convicts were then sent to Australia. In total, 300,000 to 400,000 people were shipped to the North American colonies as unfree laborers, between 1/2 and 2/3 of all white immigrants.

The British conceived of the American colonies as a "wasteland", and a place to dump their underclass. The people they sent there were "waste people", the "scum and dregs" of society. The term "waste people" gave way to "squatters" and "crackers", used to describe the settlers who populated the Western frontier of the United States and the backcountry of some southern states, but who did not have title to the land they settled on, and had little or no access to education or religious training. "Cracker" was especially used in the South. These people – trappers, miners, and small farmers of the backwoods – brought with them the "customs, routines and beliefs" of the old country, orally-based ethics and morality which were recapitulated in their new environment. These included concepts of personal worthiness and honor, as well as the desire to protect the community from outside dangers by, for instance, the abhorrence for and prevention of race-mixing.

The Brandeis University historian David Hackett Fischer makes a case for an enduring genetic basis for a "willingness to resort to violence" – citing especially the finding of high blood levels of testosterone – in the four main chapters of his book Albion's Seed. He proposes that a propensity of violence in the Mid-Atlantic, Southern and Western states is inheritable by genetic changes wrought over generations living in traditional herding societies in Northern England, the Scottish Borders, and Irish Border Region. He proposes that this propensity has been transferred to other ethnic groups by shared culture, whence it can be traced to different urban populations of the United States.

Even before there was any scientific investigation into the roots of the poor white people of the South, social critic H. L. Mencken, in his 1919 essay "Sahara of the Bozart", challenged the prevailing myth at the time that "poor white trash", and, indeed, most of the South's population, were primarily of Anglo-Saxon stock.  Mencken wrote:

The chief strain down there, I believe, is Celtic rather than Saxon, particularly in the hill country French blood, too, shows itself here and there, and so does Spanish, and so does German. The last-named entered from the northward, by way of the limestone belt just east of the Alleghenies, Again, it is very likely that in some parts of the South a good many of the plebeian whites have more than a trace of Negro blood. Interbreeding under concubinage produced some very light half-breeds at an early day, and no doubt appreciable numbers of them went over into the white race by the simple process of changing their abode.

Early 19th century
The first use of "white trash" in print to describe the Southern poor white population occurred in 1821. It came into common use in the 1830s as a pejorative used by house slaves against poor whites. In 1833, Fanny Kemble, an English actress visiting Georgia, noted in her journal: "The slaves themselves entertain the very highest contempt for white servants, whom they designate as 'poor white trash'". This term achieved widespread popularity in the 1850s, and by 1855, it had passed into common usage by upper-class whites, and was common usage among all Southerners, regardless of race, throughout the rest of the 19th century.

In 1854, Harriet Beecher Stowe wrote the chapter "Poor White Trash" in her book A Key to Uncle Tom's Cabin. Stowe wrote that slavery not only produces "degraded, miserable slaves", but also "a poor white population as degraded and brutal as ever existed in any of the most crowded districts of Europe." The plantation system forced those whites to struggle for subsistence, becoming an "inconceivably brutal" group resembling "some blind, savage monster, which, when aroused, tramples heedlessly over everything in its way." Beyond economic factors, Stowe traces the existence of this class to the shortage of schools and churches in their communities, and remarks that both blacks and whites in the area look down on these "poor white trash".

In Stowe's second novel Dred, she describes the poor white inhabitants of the Great Dismal Swamp, which formed much of the border between Virginia and North Carolina, as an ignorant, degenerate, and immoral class of people prone to criminality. Hinton Rowan Helper's extremely influential 1857 book The Impending Crisis of the South – which sold 140,000 copies and was considered to be the most important book of the 19th century by many people – describes the region's poor Caucasians as a class oppressed by the effects of slavery, a people of lesser physical stature who would be driven to extinction by the South's "cesspool of degradation and ignorance."

Historian Jeffrey Glossner of the University of Mississippi writes:

During the Civil War
During the Civil War, the Confederacy instituted conscription to raise soldiers for its army, with all men between the ages of 18 and 35 being eligible to be drafted – later expanded to all men between 17 and 50. However, exemptions were numerous, including any slave-owner with more than 20 slaves, political officeholders, teachers, ministers and clerks, and men who worked in valuable trades. Left to be drafted, or to serve as paid substitutes, were poor white trash Southerners, who were looked down on as cannon fodder. Conscripts who failed to report for duty were hunted down by so-called "dog catchers". Poor southerners said that it was a "rich man's war", but "a poor man's fight." While upper-class Southern "cavalier" officers were granted frequent furloughs to return home, this was not the case with the ordinary private soldier, which led to an extremely high rate of desertion among this group, who put their families' well-being above the cause of the Confederacy, and thought of themselves as "Conditional Confederates." Deserters harassed soldiers, raided farms and stole food, and sometimes banded together in settlements, such as the "Free State of Jones" (formerly Jones County) in Mississippi; desertion was openly joked about. When found, deserters could be executed or humiliated by being put into chains.

Despite the war being fought to protect the right of the patrician elite of the South to own slaves, the planter class was reluctant to give up their cash crop, cotton, to grow the corn and grain needed by the Confederate armies and the civilian population. As a result, food shortages, exacerbated by inflation and hoarding of foodstuffs by the rich, caused the poor of the South to suffer greatly. This led to food riots of angry mobs of poor women who raided stores, warehouses, and depots looking for sustenance for their families. Both the male deserters and the female rioters put the lie to the myth of Confederate unity, and that the war was being fought for the rights of all white Southerners.

Ideologically, the Confederacy claimed that the system of slavery in the South was superior to the class divisions of the North, because while the South devolved all its degrading labor onto what it saw as an inferior race, the black slaves, the North did so to its own "brothers in blood", the white working class. This the leaders and intellectuals of the Confederacy called "mudsill" democracy, and lauded the superiority of the pure-blooded Southern slave-owning "cavaliers" – who were worth five Northerners in a fight – over the sullied Anglo-Saxon upper class of the North. For its part, some of the military leaders of the North, especially Generals Ulysses S. Grant and William Tecumseh Sherman, recognized that their fight was not only to liberate slaves, but also the poor white Southerners who were oppressed by the system of slavery. Thus they took steps to exploit the class divisions between the "white trash" population and plantation owners. An Army chaplain wrote in a letter to his wife after the Union siege of Petersburg, Virginia that winning the war would not only result in the end of American slavery, but would also increase opportunities for "poor white trash." He said that the war would "knock off the shackles of millions of poor whites, whose bondage was really worse than that African." In these respects, the Civil War was to a certain extent a class war. After the Civil War and his presidency, in 1879 during his world tour, Grant said that he had hoped that the war would have freed the "poor white class" of the South from "a bondage in some respects even worse than slavery. ... But they have been as much under the thumb of the slave holder as before the war."

During Reconstruction
After the war, President Andrew Johnson's first idea for the reconstruction of the South was not to take steps to create an egalitarian democracy. Instead, he envisioned what was essentially a "white trash republic", in which the aristocracy would maintain their property holdings and an amount of social power, but be disenfranchised until they could show their loyalty to the Union. The freed blacks would no longer be slaves, but would still be denied essential rights of citizenship and would make up the lowest rung on the social ladder. In between would be the poor white Southerner, the white trash, who while occupying a lesser social position, would essentially become the masters of the South, voting and occupying political offices, and maintaining a superior status to the free blacks and freed slaves. Emancipated from the inequities of the plantation system, poor white trash would become the bulwark of Johnson's rebuilding of the South and its restoration into the Union.

Johnson's plan was never put into effect, and the Freedmen's Bureau – which was created in 1865, before President Abraham Lincoln was assassinated – was authorized to help "all refugees and all freedmen", black and white alike. The agency did this despite Johnson's basic lack of concern for the freed slaves the war had supposedly been fought over. But even though they provided relief to them, the Bureau did not accept Johnson's vision of poor whites as the loyal and honorable foundation of a reconstructed South. Northern journalists and other observers maintained that poor white trash, who were now destitute refugees, "beggars, dependents, houseless and homeless wanderers", were still victimized by poverty and vagrancy. They were "loafers" dressed in rags and covered in filth who did no work, but accepted government relief handouts. They were seen as only slightly more intelligent than blacks. One observer, James R. Gilmore, a cotton merchant and novelist who had traveled throughout the South, wrote the book Down in Tennessee, published in 1864, in which he differentiated poor whites into two groups, "mean whites" and "common whites". While the former were thieves, loafers, and brutes, the latter were law-abiding citizens who were enterprising and productive. It was the "mean" minority who gave white trash their bad name and character.

A number of commentators noted that poor white Southerners did not compare favorably to freed blacks, who were described as "capable, thrifty, and loyal to the Union." Marcus Sterling, a Freedmen's Bureau agent and a former Union officer, said that the "pitiable class of poor whites" were "the only class which seem almost unaffected by the [bureau's] great benevolence and its bold reform", while in contrast black freedmen had become "more settled, industrious and ambitious," eager to learn how to read and improve themselves. Sidney Andrews saw in blacks a "shrewd instinct for preservation" which poor whites did not have, and Whitelaw Reid, a politician and newspaper editor from Ohio, thought that black children appeared eager to learn. Atlantic Monthly went so far as to suggest that government policy should switch from "disenfranchis[ing] the humble, quiet, hardworking Negro" and cease to provide help to the "worthless barbarian", the "ignorant, illiterate, and vicious" white trash population.

So, during the Reconstruction Era, white trash were no longer seen simply as a freakish, degenerate breed who lived almost invisibly in the backcountry wilderness, the war had brought them out of the darkness into the mainstream of society, where they developed the reputation of being a dangerous class of criminals, vagrants and delinquents, lacking intelligence, unable to speak properly, the "Homo genus without the sapien", an evolutionary dead end in the Social Darwinist thinking of the time. Plus, they were immoral, breaking all social codes and sexual norms, engaging in incest and prostitution, pimping out family members, and producing numerous in-bred bastard children.

Scalawags and rednecks
One of the responses of Southerners and Northern Democrats after the war to Reconstruction was the invention of the myth of the "carpetbaggers", those Northern Republican scoundrels and adventurers who were said to have invaded the South to take advantage of its people, but less well known are those that were called "scalawags", Southern whites who betrayed their race by supporting the Republican Party and Reconstruction. The scalawag, even if they came from a higher social class, was often described as having a "white trash heart". They were decried as "Black Republicans", and were accused of easily mingling with blacks, inviting them to dine in their homes, and inciting them by encouraging them to seek social equality. The Democrats retaliated with Autobiography of a Scalawag, a parody of the standard "self-made man" story, in which a white trash southerner with no innate ambition is nevertheless raised to a position of middling power just by being in the right place at the right time, or by lying and cheating.

Around 1890, the term "redneck" began to be widely used for poor white southerners, especially those racist followers of the Democratic demagogues of the time. Rednecks were found working in the mills, living deep in the swamps, heckling at Republican rallies, and were even occasionally elected to be a state legislator. Such was the case with Guy Rencher, who claimed that "redneck" came from his own "long red neck".

The "New South"
Beginning in the 1890s and continuing through the turn of the century, the "New South" movement introduced industrialization to the South, primarily in the form of hundreds of cotton mills, which sprang up in practically every town, village or hamlet where there was a flow of water to provide energy to power the mill. The poor whites who had not already become sharecroppers or tenant farmers on cotton plantations moved into housing provided by the mills, and every member of the family, down to children as young as 6, 7 or 8, worked at the mill, often from before dawn until after dark, for daily wages which were about half of those prevalent for similar work in the North. Deprived of sunlight, working on badly ventilated mill floors, eating a diet which was no better than they had consumed before becoming industrialized, the mill worker became a notable physical type:

A dead white skin, a sunken chest, and stooping shoulders were the earmarks of the breed. Chinless faces, microcephalic foreheads, rabbit teeth, goggling dead-fish eyes, rickety limbs and stuented stunted bodies abounded – over and beyond the limits of their prevalence in the countryside. The women were characteristically stringy-haired and limp of breast at twenty, and shrunken hags at thirty of forty. And the incidence of tuberculosis, of insanity and epilepsy, and, above all, of pellagra, the curious vitamin-deficiency disease which is nearly peculiar to the South, was increasing.

The societal organization of the mills was taken directly from that of the plantations, with the head of the mills replacing the planter as the master, and the mill providing for its workers housing – for which it charged rent – "company stores" – where goods could be bought and charged against future earnings, putting the worker eternally in the company's debt – even churches and schools – paying the wages of the parson and the teacher – for the mills stood in large part just outside already organized municipal boundaries. And the mill workers, as described above, attracted a new bevy of insulting and disdainful names, such as "lint-heads", "cotton-tails", "factory rats", and "cotton-mill trash".

Eugenics

Also around 1890, the American eugenics movement turned its attention to poor white trash. They were stigmatized as being feeble-minded and promiscuous, having incestuous and inter-racial sex, and abandoning or mistreating the children of those unions. Eugenicists campaigned successfully for laws that would allow rural whites fitting these descriptions to be involuntarily sterilized by the state, in order to "cleanse" society of faulty genetic heritages.

In 1907, Indiana passed the first eugenics-based compulsory sterilization law in the world. Thirty U.S. states would soon follow their lead. Although the law was overturned by the Indiana Supreme Court in 1921, in the 1927 case Buck v. Bell, the U.S. Supreme Court upheld the constitutionality of the Virginia Sterilization Act of 1924, allowing for the compulsory sterilization of patients of state mental institutions.

The Depression

The beginning of the 20th century brought no change of status for poor white southerners, especially after the onset of the Great Depression. The condition of this class was presented to the public in Margaret Bourke-White's photographic series for Life magazine and the work of other photographers made for Roy Stryker's Historical Section of the federal Resettlement Agency. Author James Agee wrote about them in his ground-breaking work Let Us Now Praise Famous Men (1941), as did Jonathan Daniels in A Southerner Discovers the South (1938).

A number of Franklin D. Roosevelt's New Deal agencies tried to help the rural poor to better themselves and to break through the social barriers of Southern society which held them back, reinstating the American Dream of upward mobility. Programs such as those of the Subsistence Homesteads Division of the Department of the Interior; its successor, the Resettlement Administration, whose express purpose was to help the poor in rural areas; and its replacement, the Farm Security Administration which aimed to break the cycle of tenant farming and sharecropping and help poor whites and blacks to own their own farms, and to initiate the creation of the communities necessary to support those farms. The agencies also provided services for migrant workers, such as the Arkies and Okies, who had been devastated by the Dust Bowl – the condition of which was well-documented by photographer Dorothea Lange in An American Exodus (1939) – and been forced to take to the road, jamming all their belongings into Ford motorcars and heading west toward California.

Important in the devising and running of these programs were politicians and bureaucrats such as Henry Wallace, the Secretary of Agriculture; Milburn Lincoln Wilson, the first head of the Subsistence Homesteads Division, who was a social scientist and an agricultural expert; and Rexford G. Tugwell, a Columbia University economics professor who managed to be appointed the first head of the Resettlement Agency, despite refusing to present himself with a "homely, democratic manner" in his confirmation hearings. Tugwell understood that the status of tenant farmers would not change if they could not vote, so he campaigned against poll tax, which prevented them voting, since they could not afford to pay it. His agency's goals were the four "R's": "retirement of bad land, relocation of rural poor, resettlement of the unemployed in suburban communities, and rehabilitation of farm families."

Other individuals important in the fight to help the rural poor were Arthur Raper, an expert on tenancy farming, whose study Preface to Peasantry (1936) explained why the south's system held back the region's poor and caused them to migrate; and Howard Odum, a University of North Carolina sociologist and psychologist who founded the journal Social Forces, and worked closely with the Federal government. Odum wrote the 600-page masterwork Southern Regions of the United States, which became a guidebook for the New Deal. Journalist Gerald W. Johnson translated Odum's ideas in the book into a popular volume, The Wasted Land. It was Odum who, in 1938, mailed questionnaires to academics to determine their views on what "poor white" meant to them. The results were in many ways indistinguishable from the popular views of "white trash" that had been held for many decades, since the words that came back all indicated serious character flaws in poor whites: "purposeless, hand to mouth, lazy, unambitious, no account, no desire to improve themselves, inertia", but, most often, "shiftless". Despite the passage of time, poor whites were still seen as white trash, a breed apart, a class partway between blacks and whites, whose shiftless ways may have even originated from their proximity to blacks.

"Trailer trash"
Trailers got their start in the 1930s, and their use proliferated during the housing shortage of World War II, when the Federal government used as many as 30,000 of them to house defense workers, soldiers and sailors throughout the country, but especially around areas with a large military or defense presence, such as Mobile, Alabama and Pascagoula, Mississippi. In her book Journey Through Chaos, reporter Agnes Meyer of The Washington Post travelled throughout the country, reporting on the condition of the "neglected rural areas", and described the people who lived in the trailers, tents, and shacks in such areas as malnourished, unable to read or write, and generally ragged. The workers who came to Mobile and Pascagoula to work in the shipyards there were from the backwoods of the South, "subnormal swamp and mountain folk" whom the locals described as "vermin"; elsewhere, they were called "squatters". They were accused of having loose morals, high illegitimacy rates, and of allowing prostitution to thrive in their "Hillbilly Havens". The trailers themselves – sometimes purchased second- or third-hand – were often unsightly, unsanitary, and dilapidated, causing communities to zone them away from the more desirable areas, which meant away from schools, stores, and other necessary facilities, often literally on the other side of the railroad tracks.

In the mid-20th century, poor whites who could not afford to buy suburban-style tract housing began to purchase mobile homes, which were not only cheaper, but which could be easily relocated if work in one location ran out. These – sometimes by choice and sometimes through local zoning laws – gathered in trailer camps, and the people who lived in them became known as "trailer trash". Despite many of them having jobs, albeit sometimes itinerant ones, the character flaws that had been perceived in poor white trash in the past were transferred to so-called "trailer trash", and trailer camps or parks were seen as being inhabited by retired persons, migrant workers, and, generally, the poor. By 1968, a survey found that only 13% of those who owned and lived in mobile homes had white collar jobs.

Outlook
According to sociologist Allyson Drinkard, writing in The Social History of the American Family, to be considered "white trash" in modern American society is different from simply being poor and white. The term 

Drinkard writes that as economic inequality continues to grow in the United States, the number of poor white people in both rural and urban areas will continue to grow. At the same time, as white privilege declines in general and minorities continue to hold a growing percentage of jobs in a declining job market, the poor white segment of the population will continue to be caught in the paradox of being a part of a privileged class, but without being able to benefit from their supposed privilege. Being white will no longer enable them to get and hold a good job, or to earn a suitable income. Poor white people, like other oppressed minorities, are born trapped in poverty, and – again, like other minorities – are blamed for their predicament, and for not being able to "raise themselves" out of their social conditions and economic status. Meanwhile, upper- and middle-class whites will continue to label them as "white trash" in order to solidify their feeling of superiority by making sure that "white trash" people are seen as outsiders.

Historian Nancy Isenberg, author of White Trash: The 400-Year Untold Story of Class in America, says that

In popular culture

White popular culture
American pop culture connects being a white, poor, rural man to both drinking and violence.

In 1900, Evelyn Greenleaf Sutherland's play Po' White Trash, explored the complicated cultural tensions and social and racial status of poor whites in the post-Reconstruction South. In O Henry's short story "Shoes" (c.1907), the protagonist, John De Graffenreid Atwood from Alabama, languishing in Mexico as an American consul, refers to a former adversary, Pink Dawson, as "Poor white trash", although he does admit that Dawson "[h]ad five hundred acres of farming land ..." Such a sizable landholding would, of course, disqualify Dawson from actually being "poor white trash", so Atwood's statement must have been an insult and not a description. George Bernard Shaw uses the term in his 1909 play The Shewing-Up of Blanco Posnet, set in the wild American west. The prostitute Feemy says to Blanco "I'll hang you, you dirty horse-thief; or not a man in this camp will ever get a word or a look from me again. You're just trash: that's what you are. White trash."

Ernest Matthew Mickler's White Trash Cooking (1986), based on the cooking of rural white Southerners, enjoyed an unanticipated rise to popularity. Sherrie A. Inness writes that authors such as Mickler use humor to convey the experience of living on the margins of white society, and to expand the definition of American culinary history beyond upper-class traditions based on European cooking.

By the 1980s, fiction was being published by Southern authors who identified as having redneck or white trash origins, such as Harry Crews, Dorothy Allison, Larry Brown, and Tim McLaurin. Autobiographies sometimes mention white trash origins. Gay rights activist Amber L. Hollibaugh wrote, "I grew up a mixed-race, white-trash girl in a country that considered me dangerous, corrupt, fascinating, exotic. I responded to the challenge by becoming that alarming, hazardous, sexually disruptive woman."

Dolly Parton regularly referred to herself as white trash telling Southern Living 

White trash! I am. People always say, 'Aren't you insulted when people call you white trash?' I say, 'Well it depends on who's calling me white trash and how they mean it.' But we really were, to some degree. Because when you're that poor and you're not educated, you fall in those categories. 

Talking about her fame, Parton said "There’s nothing like white trash at the White House!" She cheerfully told Rolling Stone she will always remain "a white-trash person".

President Jimmy Carter quoted a supporter who called him "white trash made good". In his 2001 biography An Hour Before Daylight: Memories of a Rural Boyhood, Carter wrote about poor white people in the 1920s and 1930s rural Georgia "For those who were lazy or dishonest, or had repulsive personal habits, 'white trash' was a greater insult than any epithet based on race." People magazine lampooned a book on Carter as a "Southern white trash novel". 

In 2006, country music star Toby Keith released an album called White Trash with Money, which reached platinum sales levels.

An, earlier example of self-identification is the 1969 song "Fancy" which was written and recorded by singer Bobbie Gentry. In the song, which was in part inspired by Gentry's own life, Gentry describes the narrator's impoverished childhood as having been "born just plain white trash", a beginning which leads her into prostitution to escape from the cycle of poverty.

In a number of instances, characters in television programs have self-identified as "white trash." For instance in the "Brown History Month" episode of the animated television series The Cleveland Show (season 1, episode 19, first broadcast on May 10, 2010), the protagonist, Cleveland Brown, a black man (who is voiced by a white actor), lives next door to Lester Krinklesac, a white man (voiced by a black actor), who has a Confederate battle flag displayed on his house. When the two come into conflict during Black History Month, Lester wears a t-shirt which says "Proud White Trash". Another animated program, also connected with Seth MacFarlane, as is The Cleveland Show, is Family Guy. In the episode "To Love and Die in Dixie" (season 3, episode 12, first broadcast November 15, 2001), the Griffin family is relocated to the South by the FBI, and Stewie is entranced by the sound of a banjo. After he plucks a string, he says that he feels "deliciously white trash" and that he wants a mullet. Later in the episode, Stewie plays banjo with a bluegrass jug band – banjo, washtub bass, washboard, and jug – performing "My Fat Baby Loves to Eat". In the same year, in "Peter Griffin: Husband, Father... Brother?" (season 3, episode 14, first broadcast December 1, 2001), Cleveland Brown receives reparations from the family that enslaved his ancestors.  Because they are now only "poor white trash", they gave what they can: a tray of Rice Krispie Treats. Ten years later, in "Amish Guy" (season 10, episode 7, first broadcast November 27, 2011), when told that the Griffin family's car trip to Columbus, Ohio to ride a roller-coaster is their vacation, the Stewie asks Brian the dog "Are we trash?", to which Brian responds "Kinda". While these self-identifications were written by Hollywood writers, their existence is an indication – as with the Dolly Parton and Bobbie Gentry examples above – that being "white trash" does not necessarily have to be a negative, and can at times be celebratory or merely a simple matter of identification; although since both The Cleveland Show and Family Guy are sitcoms, the circumstances must have been thought to have comic value as well.

Black popular culture
Use of "white trash" epithets has been extensively reported in African American culture. Some black authors have noted that blacks, when taunted by whites as "niggers", taunted back, calling them "white trash" or "crackers". Black parents often teach their children that poor whites are "white trash". The epithet appears in black folklore. As an example, blacks who were slaves would, when out of earshot of whites that owned slaves, refer to harsh slave owners as a "low down" man, "lower than poor white trash", or "a brute, really".

Zora Neale Hurston's Seraph on the Suwanee (1948) explored images of "white trash" women. In 2000, Chuck Jackson argued in the African American Review that Hurston's meditation on abjection, waste, and the construction of class and gender identities among poor whites reflects the eugenics discourses of the 1920s.

See also

 List of ethnic slurs
 Class prejudice
 Clay eater
 Cracker
 Florida cracker
 Georgia cracker
 Eurotrash (term)

 Hillbilly
 Okie
 Peckerwood
 Poor White
 Redneck
 Scalawag

 Stereotypes of white people in the United States
 Trailer trash
 Underclass
 Whiteness studies
 Yokel

References
Informational notes

Citations

Bibliography

 
 
 
 
 
 
 

Further reading

 
 
 
 

 
 Sullivan, Nell. "Academic Constructions of 'White Trash'" in

External links

 Allison, Dorothy "A Question of Class"

1820s neologisms
American phraseology
Pejorative terms for white people
Class-related slurs
Race and society
Stereotypes of rural people
Stereotypes of white Americans
Stereotypes of the working class
Social class in the United States
English phrases